The 2022 Laver Cup was the fifth edition of the Laver Cup, a men's tennis tournament between teams from Europe and the rest of the world. It was held on an indoor hard court at The O2 Arena in London, England from 23 until 25 September.

This tournament marked the retirement of 20-time singles major champion and former singles world No. 1, Roger Federer. The former champion alongside longtime rival Rafael Nadal was narrowly defeated in the third-set super tiebreak against Jack Sock and Frances Tiafoe. 

Team World won the title for the first time.

Player selection
On 3 February 2022, Rafael Nadal and Roger Federer were the first players to confirm their participation for Team Europe. 

On 17 June 2022, Félix Auger-Aliassime, Taylor Fritz  and Diego Schwartzman were the first players confirmed for Team World. On June 29, 2022, Andy Murray announced he would make his Laver Cup debut for Team Europe. 

Novak Djokovic was announced as the fourth player for Team Europe on 22 July 2022, completing the Big Four lineup for the event. 

On 2 August 2022, organizers announced that Jack Sock would join Team World. On 10 August 2022, Team Europe announced its final line-up with Stefanos Tsitsipas and Casper Ruud also taking part.  Team World captain John McEnroe chose John Isner and Alex de Minaur as his final picks on 25 August 2022. However, Isner withdrew due to injury. As a result, he was replaced by Frances Tiafoe.

Federer played his 1750th (singles and doubles combined) and last match on the ATP Tour in doubles partnering Nadal on Day 1, and was replaced by alternate Matteo Berrettini from Day 2. Nadal also withdrew after Day 1; his place was taken by Cameron Norrie.

Prize money 
The total prize money for 2022 Laver Cup was set at $2,250,000 for all 12 participating players.

Each winning team member pocketed $250,000, the same amount as in the 2021 Laver Cup. Each losing team member received $125,000.

Participants

Matches
Each match win on day 1 was worth one point, on day 2 two points, and on day 3 three points. The first team to 13 points won.

Player statistics

References

External links

2022
2022 ATP Tour
2022 in English sport
2022 sports events in London
September 2022 sports events in the United Kingdom
Sports competitions in London
Tennis tournaments in England